Hillcrest High School is an Ottawa-Carleton District School Board high school in the Elmvale Acres neighbourhood of Ottawa, Ontario, Canada. The school was opened in 1961. Its sports teams are nicknamed "The Hawks". Its exclusive catchment area covers the neighbourhoods of Riverview, Faircrest Heights, Playfair Park, Elmvale Acres, Urbandale, Hawthorne Meadows, Sheffield Glen, Hunt Club Park and part of Greenboro.

Hillcrest High School is an ethnically diverse school. The surrounding area includes significant Black, Arab, Indian, and Somali communities, among others. Hillcrest also offers a full-immersion French program.

Sports

Hillcrest has a long history of success in sports. The school has won numerous boys' rugby, basketball and hockey championships.  The senior boys' rugby team was considered the top in the city, years 2006–08.  The junior basketball team was considered the top in the city in the year 2008–09.  Hillcrest's varsity girls' hockey team claimed the tier 2 championship, two years in a row 08-09 and 09–10. Also notable is their track team's long history of success at the city and provincial levels. In the past, players on the Ottawa 67's attended Hillcrest during the season (prior to changes to the cross-boundary transfer process).

News

In June 2022, a community worker connected to Hillcrest posted a petition to remove the principal over allegations of racism. The Principal and other teaching staff were alleged to have singled-out Black and Arab students for discipline, including monitoring washrooms for vaping, doing searches, and following procedures set by the board for mandatory police contact. The Ottawa-Carleton District School Board have determined school staff followed required policies and procedures. A new principal began anyway in September 2022.

Notable alumni

David Azzi (football player)
Belly (rapper)
Nick Boynton (hockey player)
Barry Brown (musician)
Sophie Buddle (comedian)
Al Charron (rugby player)
Logan Couture (hockey player)
Chris Gardner (curler)
Stewart Gavin (hockey player)
Derek Joslin (hockey player)
Corey Locke (hockey player)
Mark Mancari (hockey player)
Massari (singer)
Grant Marshall (hockey player)
Jamie McGinn (hockey player)
Terry McGurrin (comedian, actor, writer)
Bryan McSheffrey (hockey player)
Sean Monahan (hockey player)
Mike Murphy (football player)
Dale Potter (football player)
Glenda Reiser (runner)
Ken Rockburn (journalist)
Tom Schultz (football player)
Tyler Toffoli (hockey player)
Michael Woods (cyclist)

See also
List of high schools in Ontario
List of Ottawa schools

External links
School website
OCDSB website
2006-2007 OCDSB school profile
2005-2006 OCDSB school profile
2004-2005 OCDSB school profile

References

 
High schools in Ottawa
Educational institutions established in 1961
1961 establishments in Ontario